Leadenhall Market is a covered market in London, located on Gracechurch Street but with vehicular access also available via Whittington Avenue to the north and Lime Street to the south and east, and additional pedestrian access via a number of narrow passageways.

It is one of the oldest markets in London, dating from the 14th century, and is located in the historic centre of the City of London financial district.

History
The market dates from the 14th century and is said to derive its name from Leather-hall, though it is disputable. The early history of Leaden Hall involves the Mayor (1446), Simon Eyre. According to John Stow, "Eyre, a draper built Leaden Hall for a common garner of corn for the use of this city".

The Market is typically open weekdays from 10 am until 6 pm, and primarily sells fresh food; among the vendors there are  cheesemongers, butchers and florists. Originally a meat, game and poultry market, it stands on what was the centre of Roman London. A number of commercial retailers are also located in the market, including clothes shops.

The ornate roof structure, painted green, maroon and cream, and cobbled floors of the current structure, designed in 1881 by Sir Horace Jones (who was also the architect of Billingsgate and Smithfield Markets), make Leadenhall Market a tourist attraction.

The main entrance to the market is on Gracechurch Street. The double height entrance is flanked by tall, narrow gabled red brick and Portland stone blocks in a 17th-century Dutch style. The adjacent buildings to the south have a continuous retail frontage which is punctuated by narrow entrances to pedestrian ways into the market.

Between 1990 and 1991 the market received a dramatic redecoration which improved its appearance, enhancing its architectural character and detail. The redecoration scheme received a special mention in the Civic Trust Awards in 1994. The market is a Grade II* listed building, being listed in 1972.

It was used to represent the area of London near the Leaky Cauldron and Diagon Alley in the film Harry Potter and the Philosopher's Stone (2001) and is featured in the films The Imaginarium of Doctor Parnassus (2009), Hereafter (2010), Brannigan (1975), Hidden City (1987) and Love Aaj Kal (2009). It was also used in the music video for the 1991 Erasure song "Love to Hate You".

Leadenhall Market formed part of the marathon course of the 2012 Olympic Games; runners passed through the market from Whittington Avenue to Lime Street.

Furthermore, it is featured in Mario Kart Tour course "London Loop".

Gallery

See also

 List of markets in London

References

External links

Grade II* listed buildings in the City of London
Retail markets in London
Tourist attractions in the City of London
Shopping centres in the City of London